Indiana Dunes National Park is a National Park Service unit on the shore of Lake Michigan in Indiana, United States. A BioBlitz took place there on May 15 and 16, 2009. During that time, a list of organisms was compiled which included a preliminary listing of the (freshwater) amphibians of the area.

The park has completed numerous inventories over the years and has identified 18 unique species of amphibians within the park boundaries.  The park represents the natural habitats along 25 miles of the Lake Michigan shoreline in Indiana.

Salamanders (Caudata)
Ambystoma (mole salamanders)
Ambystoma jeffersonianum – Jefferson salamander
Ambystoma laterale – blue-spotted salamander
Ambystoma tigrinum tigrinum – tiger salamander
Plethodon cinereus – red-backed salamander

Frogs and toads (Anura)
Acris crepitans blanchardi – Blanchard's cricket frog
Bufo americanus, Anaxyrus americanus – American toad
Anaxyrus fowleri – Fowler's toad
Hyla versicolor – gray treefrog
Pseudacris crucifer – spring peeper
Pseudacris triseriata – western chorus frog
Rana catesbeiana, Lithobates catesbeiana – American bullfrog
Lithobates clamitans – northern green frog
Rana pipiens, Lithobates pipiens – northern leopard frog
Rana sylvatica, Lithobates sylvaticus – wood frog

Newts (Pleurodelinae)
Notophthalmus viridescens louisianensis – eastern newt (Notophthalmus viridescens)

Notes

Indiana Dunes
Lists of fauna of Indiana
Amphibians